WJFS-LP is a low-powered radio station broadcasting at 101.1 Megahertz on the FM dial.
 The station is a radio service of the Gatlinburg Church of Christ providing gospel music and audio broadcasts of all worship services.

The church and radio station were both destroyed in the November 2016 Great Smoky Mountain Wildfires. The station was off the air from November 2016 until April 2017.

References

External links
Gatlinburg Church of Christ

JFS-LP
Sevier County, Tennessee
Gatlinburg, Tennessee
Radio stations established in 2015
2015 establishments in Tennessee
JFS-LP